Meath Intermediate Football Championship is an annual Gaelic Athletic Association second-tier competition between Gaelic football clubs organised by Meath GAA. The winning club is promoted to the Meath Senior Football Championship. In the 2021 final, Trim defeated Oldcastle. Each year, the final takes place in Pairc Tailteann, Navan. The winning club competes in the Leinster Intermediate Club Football Championship.
The current (2021) champions are Trim.

Qualification for subsequent competitions

Meath Intermediate Club Football Championship
The Meath IFC winner qualifies for the Leinster Intermediate Club Football Championship. It is the only team from County Meath to qualify for this competition. The Meath IFC winner may enter the Leinster Intermediate Club Football Championship at either the preliminary round or the quarter-final stage.

Meath IFC winning clubs won consecutive Leinster titles in the 2010s: Ratoath doing so in 2015 and St Colmcille's doing so in 2016, the latter with a stoppage time fee to secure a one-point win.

All-Ireland Intermediate Club Football Championship
The Meath IFC winner — by winning the Leinster Intermediate Club Football Championship — may qualify for the All-Ireland Intermediate Club Football Championship, at which it would enter at the __ stage, providing it hasn't been drawn to face the British champions in the quarter-finals. For example, 2021 winner Trim played in the All-Ireland final at Croke Park, as did 2016 winner St Colmcille's, also at GAA headquarters.

History
Wolfe Tones went from the Meath Junior Football Championship through this competition and on to being Meath Senior Football Championship winners in the space of four seasons in the early 21st-century, featuring Meath player Cian Ward, whose emergence as one of Meath's "most exciting talents" coincided with this run, while 1996 All-Ireland Senior Football Championship-winning captain Tommy Dowd also joined the club around this time.

Intermediate teams
In 2021, the 20 clubs competing in the Intermediate Football Championship are:

Top winners 
Clubs in bold still in existence as football clubs.

Roll of honour

References

External links
Official Meath Website
Meath on Hoganstand
Meath Club GAA
Championship Proposal 2012

 
2
Intermediate Gaelic football county championships
Recurring sporting events established in 1927